Suseong-gu Office Station is a station of the Daegu Metro Line 2 in Beomeo-dong, Suseong District, Daegu, South Korea. Suseong District Office is closer to Beomeo Station than Suseong-gu Office Station.

External links 

  Cyber station information from Daegu Metropolitan Transit Corporation

Daegu Metro stations
Suseong District
Railway stations opened in 2005